The Xin-Fu-Hwa, is a residential skyscraper located in Sinsing District, Kaohsiung, Taiwan. Construction of the building began in 1998 and it was one of the tallest residential buildings in Kaohsiung when it was completed in 2000. The building is located close to Kaohsiung Central Park, with a view of the cityscape of Kaohsiung on its top floors.

See also 
 List of tallest buildings in Taiwan
 List of tallest buildings in Kaohsiung
 Peace Palace (Taipei)
 55 Timeless
 Central Park (Kaohsiung)

References

2000 establishments in Taiwan
Apartment buildings in Taiwan
Residential buildings completed in 2000
Residential skyscrapers in Taiwan
Skyscrapers in Kaohsiung